Ich bin ein Star – Holt mich hier raus! returned for its fourteenth series on 10 January 2020 on RTL. Sonja Zietlow and Daniel Hartwich returned for their fourteenth and eighth season as hosts, respectively. Also the paramedic Bob McCarron alias "Dr. Bob" was back.

On 26 January 2020, the season was won by Prince Damien Ritzinger, with Sven Ottke finishing as the runner-up.

Celebrities
The celebrity cast line-up for the fourteenth series was confirmed on 31 December 2019.

Results and elimination
 Indicates that the celebrity received the most votes from the public
 Indicates that the celebrity received the fewest votes and was eliminated immediately (no bottom two)
 Indicates that the celebrity was in the bottom two of the public vote

Notes
 On day 10, none of the celebrities were eliminated because on day 2, Günther withdrew.
 The public voted for who they wanted to win, rather than save.

Bushtucker trials
The contestants take part in daily trials to earn food. These trials aim to test both physical and mental abilities. The winner is usually determined by the number of stars collected during the trial, with each star representing a meal earned by the winning contestant for their camp mates.

 The public voted for who they wanted to face the trial
 The contestants decided who did which trial
 The trial was compulsory and neither the public nor celebrities decided who took part

Notes
 Prince Damien won one Star.
 Marco, Anastasiya and Markus won by one Star.
 Günther was not able to participate, so Danni was allowed to do it for him.
 Markus, Sonja and Prince Damien won by one Star.
 Trial refused with the words Ich bin ein Star – Holt mich hier raus!.
 Each Contestant had 2 votes and they had to give 1 vote for one man and one for a woman.
 The 3 with the most votes had to go to the Bushtucker trial (Sven, Raul and Markus). Since Sven had the most votes, he had to choose a fourth player and he chose Anastasiya.
 Prince Damien and Claudia won 3 out of 4 stars each.
 Markus and Raúl had the most votes and had to go to Bushtucker trial. They had to choose a third celebrity between Danni and Sven, with the last going with them.

Result table: Who Should go to the Bushtucker Trials?

Star count

Treasure Hunt
The candidates go on a treasure hunt in pairs and solve a task. If successful, they usually bring a treasure chest to the camp. There the chest is opened, in which there is a quiz question with two possible answers. If the candidates answer the task correctly, there is a profit such as sweets or spices; if they answer incorrectly, there is a useless consolation prize such as a garden gnome. Less often there is an instant win after completing the task.

 The celebrities got the question correct
 The celebrities got the question wrong

Notes
 Shortly after arriving at the scene on 20 January, the treasure hunt was cancelled due to a thunderstorm. It was repeated the next day, yet since Sonja had left the camp in the meantime she was replaced by Elena.

Ratings

References

External links
 

14
2020 German television seasons